Department of Conservation may refer to a number of government departments:


United States
 California  Department of Conservation
 Massachusetts Department of Conservation and Recreation
 Missouri Department of Conservation

Elsewhere

 Agriculture, Fisheries and Conservation Department, Hong Kong
 Department of Conservation (New Zealand)
 Department of Environment and Conservation (Western Australia)

See also 
 Department of Environment and Conservation (disambiguation)
 Department of Environmental Management (disambiguation)
 Department of Environmental Protection (disambiguation)
 Department of Natural Resources (disambiguation)